Admiral Sir George Frederick Basset Edward-Collins  (26 December 1883 – 17 February 1958) was a British senior officer in the Royal Navy during the first half of the twentieth century.

Early life
Edward-Collins was born in Bodmin, Cornwall, the son of Edward Charles Edward-Collins, of Trewardale, Blisland, a local landowner.  He was the younger brother of Charles Edward-Collins.

Naval career
Edward-Collins enrolled in the navy on 15 January 1898.

He was also captain of the battlecruiser  from December 1930 till March 1932, and was appointed Chief of Staff to the Commander-in-Chief of the Mediterranean Fleet on 13 September 1935. From 1938 until 1940 he commanded the 2nd Cruiser Squadron, and later in 1940 he became second in command of the Home Fleet. From June to November 1940 he commanded the 18th Cruiser Squadron. In December 1940 Edward-Collins became Flag Officer Commanding Gibraltar and Mediterranean Approaches. He was promoted to admiral on 21 January 1943, and retired on 7 February 1944.

Awards and recognition
Edward-Collins became Knight Commander of the Royal Victorian Order on 17 June 1939. He was mentioned in dispatches in 1940, and became Knight Commander of the Order of the Bath on 1 January 1941. He was awarded the Order Odrodzenia Polski (4th class) in recognition of services to the Polish Navy on 22 December 1942.

References

1883 births
1958 deaths
foreign recipients of the Legion of Merit
governors of Gibraltar
Knights Commander of the Order of the Bath
Knights Commander of the Royal Victorian Order
military personnel from Cornwall
people from Bodmin
recipients of the Order of Polonia Restituta
Royal Navy admirals of World War II
Royal Navy officers of World War I
Royal Navy personnel of the Boxer Rebellion
sailors from Cornwall